The Rockwell Light is located on the northern harbor area of Oshkosh, Wisconsin, in Winnebago County, Wisconsin.

History
The lighthouse was thought up by William Bray as a way to mark his harbor as well as the entrance to the Fox River. In 1909 Bray found an architect who drew up the plans but he died in that year before he could carry through with the work. Bray had the lighthouse completed in 1910 which appeared on Light Lists for several decades. William Bray had paid for the lighthouse using his own funds. Later after commercial traffic picked up in the port the government realized the importance of the light so they paid some of its expenses. The lighthouse was sold in 1917 and changed hands several times before a restoration job was done the following year. In the 1920s the lighthouse was operated by the Cook & Brown Lime Company which shipped goods along the Fox River. The company owned the lighthouse until at least 1965, further future information is unavailable. At some point the lighthouse was deactivated as the structure no longer appears on the Coast Guard's official Light List.

Notes

Further reading

 Havighurst, Walter (1943) The Long Ships Passing: The Story of the Great Lakes, Macmillan Publishers.
 Oleszewski, Wes, Great Lakes Lighthouses, American and Canadian: A Comprehensive Directory/Guide to Great Lakes Lighthouses, (Gwinn, Michigan: Avery Color Studios, Inc., 1998) .
 
 Wright, Larry and Wright, Patricia, Great Lakes Lighthouses Encyclopedia Hardback (Erin: Boston Mills Press, 2006) .

External links

Lighthouses completed in 1949
Buildings and structures in Oshkosh, Wisconsin
Lighthouses in Winnebago County, Wisconsin